Mass media in Tanzania includes print, radio, television, and the Internet. The "Tanzania Communications Regulatory Act" of 2003 created the Tanzania Communications Regulatory Authority, which oversees broadcast licensing. The Media Council of Tanzania began in 1995.

Publications

Radio

 Fasihi Media House
 Clouds FM
 East Africa Radio
 Kiss FM
 Wasafi Fm
 Praise Power FM
 Choice FM 
 Mbeya Highlands FM
 Orkonerei Radio Service
 Parapanda Radio Tanzania
 Radio Free Africa
 Radio One
 Radio Tanzania
 Radio Tanzania Zanzibar
 Radio Tumaini
 Radio Uhuru
 Tanzania Broadcasting Corporation
 Voice of Tanzania-Zanzibar 
 Radio Karagwe FM - Sauti ya Wananchi.KARAGWE-KAGERA

Television
"State TV Tanzania Broadcasting Corporation known as TBC launched in 2001, several years after the first private station. 

Current TV networks and stations include:
East Africa Tv
Mambo Tv Swahili
Clouds Tv 
Wasafi Tv
Ebenezer TV
Barmedas TV
TV E
 Al Itrah Broadcasting Network Television (IBN TV)
 Coastal Television Network
 Dar es Salaam Television
 Independent Television
 Kwanza TV 
 Star TV
 Tanzania Broadcasting Corporation
 Televishini ya Taifa (TVT)
 TV1 (Tanzania)
 TVZ (TV Zanzibar)
 MAHAASIN TV

See also
 Telecommunications in Tanzania
 Tanzanian literature

References

Bibliography
 
  
  (Includes information about radio, newspapers, etc.)
 
 
  ("Bloggers in Tanzania will have to pay $920 (£660) for the privilege of posting content online, according to new regulations.")

 
Tanzania
Tanzania